Alexander Caie (25 June 1877 – 17 November 1914), sometimes known as Sandy Caie, was a Scottish professional footballer who played as a right half and centre forward in the Football League for Newcastle United and Woolwich Arsenal. He also played in Scotland and Canada.

Personal life 
Caie was killed in a rail accident in Massachusetts, United States on 17 November 1914.

Career statistics

References

Scottish footballers
Brentford F.C. players
English Football League players
Association football wing halves
Association football forwards
Victoria United F.C. players
Arsenal F.C. players
Southern Football League players
1877 births
People from Aberdeen
1914 deaths
Bristol City F.C. players
Millwall F.C. players
Newcastle United F.C. players
Motherwell F.C. players
Scottish Football League players
Scottish expatriate footballers
Scottish expatriate sportspeople in Canada
Expatriate soccer players in Canada
Scottish expatriate sportspeople in the United States
Railway accident deaths in the United States
Accidental deaths in Massachusetts